Still Can't The Dead is the seventh full-length studio album by the Japanese band Doom. The album was released on March 2, 2016.

The band revealed the album artwork on their Facebook page on December 14, 2015. The track list was revealed on December 30 on their Twitter account.

Track listing 

 Introduce 99s Life... Getting Lies – 2:56
 All Your Fears – 8:51  
 The Folly and Splice – 6:47  
 Still Can't The Dead – 9:12  
 Siesta... – 5:40  
 Which One...!? – 5:56  
 All That is Gone – 6:14  
 Ibiza – 2:24  
 Never Seen... The God – 6:34

References 

2016 albums
Doom (Japanese band) albums